Deerfield Presbyterian Church is a historic church in the Seabrook section of Upper Deerfield Township in Cumberland County, New Jersey, United States.

It was built 1771 and added to the National Register of Historic Places in 1980.

See also
National Register of Historic Places listings in Cumberland County, New Jersey

References

Presbyterian churches in New Jersey
Churches on the National Register of Historic Places in New Jersey
Churches completed in 1771
Churches in Cumberland County, New Jersey
National Register of Historic Places in Cumberland County, New Jersey
Upper Deerfield Township, New Jersey
New Jersey Register of Historic Places
18th-century Presbyterian church buildings in the United States